Baek Jin-hee (born February 8, 1990) is a South Korean actress. She began to be known for her role in High Kick: Revenge of the Short Legged (2011–2012) and rose to prominence for her role in Empress Ki (2013).

Career
Baek Jin-hee began her entertainment career after getting scouted on the streets by a talent agent. She has since then starred in the indie film Bandhobi (2009), where she plays a rebellious girl who befriends a Bangladeshi migrant worker; and sex comedy Foxy Festival (2010) where she plays a teenager with a thriving business selling her used underwear. 

Baek then starred in the sitcom High Kick: Revenge of the Short Legged (2011-2012), playing a fresh graduate looking for employment. The series was popular and led to increased recognition for the actress. This was followed with supporting roles in fusion historical drama Jeon Woo-chi and romance drama Pots of Gold. 

Baek had her breakthrough role as the villainous empress Tanashiri (Danashiri) in the period drama Empress Ki (2013-2014), She next starred as an orphaned casino dealer in melodrama Triangle (2014), and a passionate prosecutor in legal drama Pride and Prejudice (2014).

In 2015, Baek played the title role in family drama My Daughter, Geum Sa-wol, which was a hit and ended with national viewership of 33.6 percent. 

In 2017, Baek played leading roles in the disaster drama Missing 9, and office comedy series Jugglers. 

In 2018, Baek was cast as the female protagonist in the third installment of the Let's Eat franchise. The same year, she starred in the webtoon-based romantic comedy drama Feel Good to Die.

Personal life
Baek Jin-Hee is the eldest of two sisters.

On March 26, 2017, Baek's agency confirmed that Baek has been in a relationship with her My Daughter, Geum Sa-wol co-star, Yoon Hyun-min since April 2016.

Filmography

Film

Television series

Web series

Variety show

Music video

Awards and nominations

References

External links
 Baek Jin-hee Fan Club at Daum 
 
 
 

South Korean television actresses
South Korean film actresses
21st-century South Korean actresses
Living people
1990 births